Kasi Viswanatha Temple is a Hindu temple located in the neighbourhood of West Mambalam in Chennai, India. Dedicated to Siva, the temple is named after the Vishwanatha Temple at Varanasi. Constructed in the 17th century, the temple is also known as "Mahabilva Kshetra".

See also

 Heritage structures in Chennai
 Religion in Chennai

References 

 

Hindu temples in Chennai